Dibusa is a genus of microcaddisflies in the family Hydroptilidae. There is one described species in Dibusa, D. angata.

References

Further reading

 
 
 

Hydroptilidae
Articles created by Qbugbot